Jessica "Jess" Orcsik, (born 14 February 1984) is the daughter of Australian actors Paula Duncan and John Orcsik. She has appeared in many Australian and international films and television productions. She is the director of an international performing arts company - J.O. International productions, and was director of Sydney-based performing company - J.O. Studios, which closed in 2013. Orcsik is an educator in international performing arts programs in Australia and the United States, and in earned the title of Australian Representative for Broadway Dance Center in 2012. Orcsik is the USA Network & Program Director for American Arts Film & Television Academy, LLC. She was also creator and director of the National Workshop & Competition called "On Broadway" and "Don't Dis Disabilities Dance Extravaganza".

She also has established her own production company Diversity Entertainment, LLC (DBA Diversity Pictures) in which she has several projects developed including A Death Perspective & VeeBees.

Her credits include a dancer in Son of the Mask, Natalie Steele in Academy and as a Credit Girl in Me, Myself & I.

She has also appeared with her mother in various commercials, TV shows, including Richmond Hill and Home and Away, and charity events for Special Olympics & LifeForce.

References

External links

http://www.joip.com.au
http://www.starnow.com.au/jesso
https://web.archive.org/web/20140407083738/http://www.joiponbroadway.com/
http://www.danceinforma.com/magazine/tag/jess-orcsik/
http://north-shore-times.whereilive.com.au/lifestyle/story/jess-and-the-family-dance-company/
http://www.jostudiosonline.com/ShowsEvents.phphttp://
http://www.danceinforma.com/USA_magazine/tag/jessica-orcsik/
http://www.danceinforma.com/magazine/tag/j-o-international-productions/
http://www.aafta.us
http://www.diversitypictures.org

Living people
Australian female dancers
21st-century Australian actresses
1984 births